The Journal of Macroeconomics is a peer-reviewed academic journal established in 1979 that covers research on a broad range of issues in monetary economics and macroeconomics, including economic growth, fluctuations, fiscal policy, and macroeconomic forecasting. The current editors are William D. Lastrapes, professor of economics at the University of Georgia; David VanHoose,  professor of economics at Baylor University; and Ping Wang, professor of economics at Washington University in St. Louis.

References

External links
 

Economics journals
Elsevier academic journals
Publications established in 1979
English-language journals